Afghanistan competed at the 2020 Summer Olympics in Tokyo. Originally scheduled to take place from 24 July to 9 August 2020, the Games were postponed to 23 July to 8 August 2021, because of the COVID-19 pandemic.

Competitors
The following is the list of number of competitors in the Games.

Athletics

Afghanistan received universality slots from World Athletics to send two athletes to the Olympics.

Track & road events

Shooting

Afghanistan received an invitation from the Tripartite Commission to send a men's rifle shooter to the Olympics, as long as the minimum qualifying score (MQS) was met, marking the nation's Olympic debut in the sport.

Qualification Legend: Q = Qualify for the next round; q = Qualify for the bronze medal (shotgun)

Swimming

Afghanistan received a universality invitation from FINA to send one top-ranked swimmers in their respective individual events to the Olympics, based on the FINA Points System of June 28, 2021.

Taekwondo
Afghanistan received an invitation from the Tripartite Commission.

References

External link

Nations at the 2020 Summer Olympics
2020
2021 in Afghan sport